{{Infobox person
| name               = Miriam-Teak Lee
| image              = 
| caption            = 
| birth_date         = 
| birth_place        = Edmonton, London, England
| alma_mater         = 
| spouse             = 
| occupation         = Actress
| years_active       = 2017–present
| known_for          = & Juliet (2019–2023)  Hamilton (2017–2019)  On the Town (2017)
| children           = 
| relatives          = Dex Lee (brother)
| awards             = Laurence Olivier Award for Best Actress in a Musical (2020)  WhatsOnStage Award for Best Actress in a Musical (2020)
}}

Miriam-Teak Lee (born 1 November 1994) is an English actress. She is known for her role as Juliet Capulet in & Juliet, for which she won a 2020 Laurence Olivier Award for Best Actress in a Leading Role in a Musical.

 Early life and education 
Lee has an older brother, Dex Lee, as well as three other brothers. Alongside Dex, she attended The Latymer School, Morgan Aslanoff School of Dance and Arts Educational School. The pair were duet partners and competed in dance competitions together.

 Acting career 
After leaving school, Lee made her London stage debut in Leonard Bernstein's musical On the Town at the Regent's Park Open Air Theatre in 2017. Two months later she made her West End debut in the original London production of Lin-Manuel Miranda's musical Hamilton at the Victoria Palace Theatre. In Hamilton, Lee was a member of the ensemble and the understudy for the leading roles of Eliza Hamilton, Angelica Schuyler Church and Peggy Schuyler. In 2019, she was chosen to play the eponymous protagonist in the juke-box musical & Juliet'' at the Manchester Opera House and then at the Shaftesbury Theatre in London's West End. For her performance Lee won critics' praises and the Laurence Olivier Award for Best Actress in a Leading Role in a Musical.

Filmography

Accolades

See also 
 List of British actors

References

External links
 

1994 births
21st-century English actresses
Actresses from London
Black British actresses
English stage actresses
English voice actresses
English musical theatre actresses
Living people
People from Edmonton, London